is a Japanese manga series written and illustrated by Kanata Konami. It was serialized in Kodansha's seinen manga magazine Weekly Morning from 2004 to 2015, with its chapters collected in twelve tankōbon volumes. The manga has been licensed for North American distribution by Vertical Inc. An anime adaptation lasting two seasons aired from March 2008 to September 2009. A 3DCG anime television adaptation lasting two seasons aired from October 2016 to September 2018.

Story
A grey and white kitten with black stripes wanders away from her mother and siblings one day while enjoying a walk outside with her family. Lost in her surroundings, the kitten struggles to find her family and instead is found by a young boy, Youhei, and his mother. They take the kitten home, but, as pets are not allowed in their housing complex, they try to find her a new home. This proves to be difficult, and the family decides to keep the kitten.

While being housebroken, the kitten mistakenly answers to "Chi" (as in shi- from shikko, the Japanese word for "urine") and this becomes her name. Chi then lives with her new family, learning about different things and meeting new people and animals.

Characters

Yamada family

Chi is a small grey and white kitten with large eyes. She is easily distracted and does not have much experience of the world. Chi is particularly attracted to small moving objects, but is scared by larger animals, especially dogs. Although her speech is audible to the viewers, the Yamadas cannot hear her talk. It is revealed her mother called her "Sarah".

Yohei is a little boy who finds Chi when she gets lost. He is cheerful, kind, obedient, and fond of toy trains.
/

Mom is a housewife. She stays home with Yohei and Chi.
/

Dad is the working man of the house, a graphic designer who often works from home. He is very fond of Chi and wants her to like him in return, but he is often called upon to do things that make her angry with him such as taking her to the vet or trimming her claws.

Manga

The manga series is written and illustrated by Kanata Konami. The first chapter was released in issue 6/2004 of the Weekly Morning manga magazine. 12 tankōbon were released. In contrast to the serialized version, which is black and white, the tankōbon version is in full color. The manga ended in June 2015. The English language version of the manga is published by Vertical Inc, and is oriented left-to-right like an American comic, instead of the typical Japanese right-to-left format. One reason for this could be to avoid confusing its young reader demographic. It has also been translated into French as Chi - Une vie de chat by Glenat.

Anime
The anime series is directed by Mitsuyuki Masuhara and produced by Madhouse, the first episode aired on 31 March 2008. The episodes are 3 minutes long and equivalent to one chapter from the manga.

The opening theme is "Home is the best!"  by Satomi Kōrogi.

The second season of Chi's Sweet Home, called Chi's Sweet Home: New Address (チーズスイートホーム あたらしいおうち Chi's Sweet Home: Atarashii Ouchi), began airing 30 March 2009.

The show was dubbed into French and began airing in France on Piwi+ in September 2014. On September 5, 2016, the series began airing on Radio-Canada.

In the Weekly Morning magazine's 22nd and 23rd issues of 2016, it was announced that the manga would receive a 3DCG anime television adaptation that began airing on October 2, 2016, called Chi's Sweet Adventure (こねこのチー　ポンポンらー大冒険 Koneko no Chī: Ponpon-rā dai bōken). An English-dubbed version of the first season streamed on Amazon Prime Video on April 21, 2018.

Episode list

Season one

Season two (New Address)

References

Further reading

External links
 Chi's Sweet Home: Official English language site hosted by Vertical, Inc.
 Chi's Sweet Home on the Weekly Morning website 
 Chi's Sweet Travel online manga on the Weekly Morning website 
 Chi's Sweet Home on the TV Tokyo website 
 Chi's Sweet Home: Atarashii Ouchi on the TV Tokyo website  
 Chi's Sweet Home on the Madhouse website 
 

2004 manga
2008 anime television series debuts
2009 anime television series debuts
2009 Japanese television series endings
2016 anime television series debuts
Anime series based on manga
Animated television series about cats
Comedy anime and manga
Comics about cats
Discotek Media
Kodansha manga
Madhouse (company)
Seinen manga
Slice of life anime and manga
TV Tokyo original programming
Vertical (publisher) titles